Xometry is an on-demand industrial parts marketplace based in Derwood, Maryland.

Its CEO and co-founder is Randy Altschuler. Its customers include BMW, NASA, Bosch, Dell and General Electric.

History

Xometry was founded in 2013 by Altschuler and Laurence Zuriff.

In July 2018, Xometry acquired MakeTime, a manufacturing platform based in Lexington, Kentucky.

In January 2019, Xometry acquired Machine Tool & Supply of Jackson, Tennessee and began to offer cutting tools, metal, and other supplies for manufacturers via Xometry Supplies.

In December 2019, Xometry acquired Shift, a Munich based on-demand manufacturing marketplace, which will now be known as Xometry Europe.

Xometry has raised about $150 million in venture capital funding.  Investors include Highland Capital Partners, T. Rowe Price Funds, and Dell Technologies Capital.  Anticipating an initial public offering in 2021, the company appointed a CFO and added Katharine Weymouth to its board of directors.

On June 30, 2021, Xometry shares began trading on the Nasdaq Global Select Market under the symbol XMTR.

In December 2021, Xometry acquired Thomas.

References

American companies established in 2013
Companies based in Gaithersburg, Maryland
Derwood, Maryland
Manufacturing companies established in 2013
2013 establishments in Maryland
Companies listed on the Nasdaq
2021 initial public offerings